Ciañu is one of eight parishes (administrative divisions) in Langreo, a municipality within the province and autonomous community of Asturias, in northern Spain.

List of towns

References 

Parishes in Langreo
Langreo